Michel Dessureault (born 11 March 1957) is a Canadian fencer. He competed at the 1976, 1984 and 1988 Summer Olympics. He was inducted into the Ottawa Sport Hall of Fame.

References

1957 births
Living people
Canadian male fencers
Olympic fencers of Canada
Fencers at the 1976 Summer Olympics
Fencers at the 1984 Summer Olympics
Fencers at the 1988 Summer Olympics
Sportspeople from Quebec
Pan American Games medalists in fencing
Medalists at the 1983 Pan American Games
Pan American Games gold medalists for Canada
Fencers at the 1983 Pan American Games